Olivia Birkelund is an American actress, best known for her role as Arlene Vaughan in the ABC daytime soap opera All My Children.

Life and career
Birkelund attended Brown University and studied acting at the Circle in the Square Theatre School. In 1991 she made her television debut as Sondra Hill in the ABC daytime soap opera, One Life to Live. In 1995, Birkelund began starring as Arlene Dillon Vaughan Chandler, Hayley's alcoholic mother, in the ABC soap opera All My Children. She appeared in show to 2002 on recurring basis. In 2008 she had another soap role, on CBS's Guiding Light.

Birkelund appeared in films Letters from a Killer (1998), The Bone Collector (1999), Uninvited (1999), Far from Heaven (2002), and on made for television movies Night Sins and On the Edge of Innocence (1997). She guest-starred on Law & Order, Homicide: Life on the Street, Star Trek: Voyager, Law & Order: Special Victims Unit, Third Watch, Law & Order: Criminal Intent, and The Good Wife. In 2014, Birkelund had a recurring role in the ABC drama Black Box.

References

External links 
 
 
 

Brown University alumni
Circle in the Square Theatre School alumni
American film actresses
American television actresses
American soap opera actresses
American stage actresses
Living people
Actresses from New York City
20th-century American actresses
21st-century American actresses
Year of birth missing (living people)